Alfredo Rafael Antonio Bengzon, also known as Alfredo R. A. Bengzon,  (born 4 July 1934) is a Filipino doctor, educator, and former public official. He is currently Vice President for the Professional Schools of the Ateneo de Manila University, dean of the Ateneo School of Medicine and Public Health, dean emeritus of the Ateneo Graduate School of Business, and President and CEO of The Medical City.

Education 
Bengzon graduated from the Ateneo de Manila in 1956 with  a Bachelor of Arts degree. He attended the University of the Philippines College of Medicine at UP Manila where he got his doctor of medicine degree, and then completed his master of business administration degree at the Ateneo Graduate School of Business in 1972.

Career 
Bengzon has had a long and distinguished career not only as a neurologist but also as leader and manager in both private and public sectors.

He was Secretary of Health, Peace Commissioner, and Vice Chair of the Philippine Negotiating Panel for the U.S. Military Facilities during the presidency of Corazon C. Aquino. He has also served as chief operating officer of several private companies engaged in health services.

In 1993, Bengzon was appointed Dean of the Ateneo Graduate School of Business and Vice President for the Professional Schools of the Ateneo de Manila University.

His most current positions are President and CEO of The Medical City in Pasig, and Dean of the Ateneo School of Medicine and Public Health (ASMPH).

Recognition 
In 1989, Bengzon was awarded the degree of Doctor of Science (honoris causa) by the Ateneo de Manila.

In 1991, he was conferred the Ramon Magsaysay Award.

In 2010, he was awarded the Lux In Domino Award by the Ateneo de Manila University.

In 2012, he received the 2012 Lifetime Achievement Award of Asia CEO.

References 

1934 births
Ateneo de Manila University alumni
Academic staff of Ateneo de Manila University
20th-century Filipino businesspeople
20th-century Filipino medical doctors
21st-century Filipino businesspeople
21st-century Filipino medical doctors
Corazon Aquino administration cabinet members
Filipino educators
Filipino neurologists
Lakas–CMD (1991) politicians
Living people
Secretaries of Health of the Philippines
University of the Philippines Manila alumni